Padma Parvati Lakshmi (born September 1, 1970) is an Indian-born American author, activist, actress, model, philanthropist, and television host. She has hosted the cooking competition program Top Chef on Bravo continuously since season 2 (2006). For her work, she received a Primetime Emmy nomination for Outstanding Reality Host in 2009 and 2020 through 2022. She is also the creator, host, and executive producer of the critically-acclaimed  docuseries Taste the Nation with Padma Lakshmi, which premiered in June 2020 on Hulu and explores the food and culture of immigrant and indigenous communities across America. In 2022, Taste the Nation: Holiday Edition won a James Beard Foundation Award in the Visual Media - Long Form category.

She has published six books: two cookbooks, Easy Exotic and Tangy, Tart, Hot & Sweet; an encyclopedia, The Encyclopedia of Spices & Herbs: An Essential Guide to the Flavors of the World; a memoir, Love, Loss, and What We Ate; a children's book, Tomatoes for Neela illustrated by Juana Martinez-Neal, and guest-edited The Best American Travel Writing 2021.

Early life
Padma Parvati Lakshmi was born in Madras (now Chennai), India, into a Tamil Brahmin family. Her mother Vijaya is a retired oncology nurse. Her parents divorced when she was two years old.

Lakshmi immigrated to the United States at age four and was raised in New York City before moving to La Puente, California with her mother and stepfather. As a teenager growing up in Los Angeles, she stated that she was bullied and endured Anti-Indian racism, which caused her to struggle to overcome "internalized self-loathing."

In 1984, when Lakshmi was 14 years old, she was hospitalized for three weeks and eventually diagnosed with Stevens–Johnson syndrome, a rare illness caused by hypersensitivity to an infection or a potentially fatal reaction to certain kinds of medications.

Two days after her discharge from the hospital, she was injured in a car accident in Malibu, California, which left her with a fractured right hip and a shattered right upper arm. The arm injury required surgery, from which she retained a seven-inch scar between her elbow and shoulder.

In a 2018 essay for The New York Times, Lakshmi revealed that she was raped by her older boyfriend when she was 16, which she did not report. She stated that her decision to keep silent about the rape resulted from her stepfather‘s relative assaulting her when she was seven years old. After she told her mother and stepfather about his assault, they sent her to live with her grandparents for a year. She wrote, "The lesson was: If you speak up, you will be cast out." She said, "I am speaking now because I want us all to fight so that our daughters never know this fear and shame and our sons know that girls’ bodies do not exist for their pleasure and that abuse has grave consequences."

Education 
Lakshmi graduated from William Workman High School in City of Industry, California, in 1988.

Lakshmi attended Clark University in Worcester, Massachusetts and graduated with a degree in theater arts and American literature in 1992. She also began her modeling career as an exchange student in Madrid, Spain.

Career

Modeling
In effect, Lakshmi began her modeling career at age 21, when a modeling agent discovered Lakshmi while she studied abroad in Madrid. She has said, "I was the first Indian model to have a career in Paris, Milan, and New York. I'm the first one to admit that I was a novelty." Lakshmi was able to pay off her college loans by working as a model and actress.

She has modeled for designers such as Emanuel Ungaro, Giorgio Armani, Gianni Versace, Ralph Lauren, and Alberta Ferretti and appeared in ad campaigns for Roberto Cavalli and Versus. She was a favorite model of the photographer Helmut Newton, whose photographs of her often highlighted the large scar on her right arm.

Lakshmi has appeared on the covers of Redbook, Vogue India, FHM, Cosmopolitan, L'Officiel India, Asian Woman, Elle, Avenue, Industry Magazine, Marie Claire (India Edition), Harper's Bazaar, Town & Country, and Newsweek. She also posed nude for the May 2009 issue of Allure.

She has done shoots for photographers Mario Testino and Helmut Newton.

Film, television, and hosting 

Lakshmi is the current host and one of the judges on the television show Top Chef. The show has been nominated for a Primetime Emmy Award for Outstanding Reality-Competition Program from season 2 through season 19, with season 6 winning the award in 2010.

She also serves as an executive producer of the show. Lakshmi was nominated for the Primetime Emmy Award for Outstanding Host for a Reality or Reality-Competition Program in 2009 and in 2020 through 2022 for Top Chef. In 2020, Lakshmi won three Critic's Choice Awards for Top Chef.

Lakshmi is also the creator, host, and executive producer of Taste the Nation with Padma Lakshmi, which premiered on Hulu on June 18, 2020, and received the Gotham Award for Breakthrough Series  and a Critic's Choice Award for Best Culinary Show. Taste the Nation received 100% on Rotten Tomatoes. In 2021, Hulu released a 4-episode special, Taste the Nation: Holiday Edition. In Taste the Nation, Lakshmi  expands and redefines the meaning of American food collectively. In June 2022, Lakshmi received her first James Beard Foundation Award for Taste the Nation: Holiday Edition.

Previously, Lakshmi served as a host of Domenica In, Italy's top-rated television show, in 1997. She hosted the Food Network series Padma's Passport, which was part of the larger series Melting Pot in 2001, where she cooked recipes from around the world. She also hosted two one-hour specials in South India and Spain for the British culinary tourism show Planet Food, broadcast on the Food Network in the U.S. and internationally on the Discovery Channels.

Lakshmi was also an official contributor for season 19 of The View from 2015 to 2016. For celebrity contestant, she competed and won against music producer Randy Jackson in an episode of TBS's Drop the Mic that aired on December 26, 2017. She has appeared on See Us Coming Together, "a special that celebrates the rich diversity of Asian and Pacific Islander communities as part of Sesame Workshop’s ongoing racial justice initiative."

Her first film roles were in the Italian pirate movies The Son of Sandokan and Caraibi (Pirates: Blood Brothers). She had a comical supporting part as the lip-synching disco singer Sylk in the 2001 American movie Glitter, starring Mariah Carey. In 2002, Lakshmi made a guest appearance as alien princess Kaitaama in "Precious Cargo," the 37th episode of the science fiction TV series Star Trek: Enterprise. She portrayed Madhuvanthi in the TV movie Sharpe's Challenge (aired 2006). In 2006, she appeared in ABC's Biblical TV series The Ten Commandments as Princess Bithia. In 2009, Lakshmi starred in the video for the Eels song "That Look You Give That Guy."

She starred in the 2003 Bollywood film Boom, alongside Katrina Kaif and Madhu Sapre, as one of three supermodels accused of stealing diamonds. She played the role of Geeta in Paul Mayeda Berges's 2005 film The Mistress of Spices. Lakshmi also made a guest appearance on the NBC series 30 Rock in 2009 and appeared on Whose Line Is It Anyway? in 2014.

Books and writing
Lakshmi's first cookbook, Easy Exotic, a compilation of international recipes and short essays released in 1999, was awarded the Best First Book at the 1999 Gourmand World Cookbook Awards in Versailles. Her second cookbook, Tangy, Tart, Hot and Sweet, was released on October 2, 2007, and was reissued in March 2021  and was named one of Apple's Best Books of 2021. Her first memoir, Love, Loss and What We Ate, was released on International's Women's Day, March 8, 2016. Lakshmi's third book, an encyclopedia and reference guide, The Encyclopedia of Spices and Herbs, on October 4, 2016. Her first children's book Tomatoes for Neela, released on August 31, 2021 and illustrated by Juana Martinez-Neal, debuted fourth on The New York Times best-seller list.

Easy Exotic: A Model's Low Fat Recipes From Around the World (1999)
 Tangy, Tart, Hot and Sweet: A World of Recipes for Every Day (2007)
 Love, Loss, and What We Ate: A Memoir (2016)
 The Encyclopedia of Spices and Herbs: An Essential Guide to the Flavors of the World (2016)
 Tomatoes for Neela (2021)

Lakshmi also guest edited The Best American Travel Writing 2021, a collection of essays from renowned travel writers.

Lakshmi wrote a syndicated column in The New York Times and has written articles on style for the American edition of Vogue, at editor Anna Wintour's request. She also wrote a column on style for Harper's Bazaar (UK and US editions), following a commission from editor Glenda Bailey.

Personal life
In April 2004, after living together for five years, Lakshmi married novelist Salman Rushdie. Rushdie stated that Lakshmi had asked for a divorce in January 2007, and later that year, in July, the couple filed it. She dated billionaire Theodore J. Forstmann.

On February 22, 2010, Lakshmi gave birth to her daughter with businessman Adam Dell.

Lakshmi speaks four languages: Tamil, Hindi, English, and Italian.

At the age of 36, Lakshmi was diagnosed with  endometriosis, which she has had since early adolescence.

Philanthropy
Lakshmi is a co-founder of the Endometriosis Foundation of America, a nonprofit organization focused on increasing awareness, education, research, and legislative advocacy against the disease. The foundation was instrumental in the 2009 opening of the MIT Center for Gynepathology Research, where Lakshmi gave the keynote address. She is a global ambassador for Keep a Child Alive, and since 2007 has traveled to sites in India on their behalf.

Activism 
Lakshmi is known as an advocate for immigrant rights, the independent restaurant industry and women's rights.

Lakshmi is the American Civil Liberties Union (ACLU) ambassador for immigration and women's rights. She has also been a critic of skin-lightening creams that are marketed to people of color. She has also spoken about the colorism she has experienced while living in India and the United States.

Lakshmi was appointed United Nations Development Programme Goodwill Ambassador on March 7, 2019. "My main mission as UNDP Goodwill Ambassador is to shine a spotlight on the fact that inequality can affect people in rich and poor countries alike. Many nations have greatly reduced poverty, but inequality has proved more stubborn," said Lakshmi. "Inequality is further compounded by gender, age, ethnicity, and race. It especially affects women, minorities, and others who face unimaginable discrimination in the societies in which they live." In December 2021, she received the Advocate of the Year Award by the United Nations Correspondents Association (UNCA). In October 2022, Lakshmi was honored at the 20th edition of the ACLU's Sing Out For Freedom benefit concert along with Patti Smith and Shaina Taub.

Selected filmography

See also
 Indians in the New York City metropolitan region
 New Yorkers in journalism

References

External links

 
 
 
 
 
 

1970 births
American actresses of Indian descent
American cookbook writers
American female models of Indian descent
American people of Indian Tamil descent
American women non-fiction writers
American women writers of Indian descent
American film actresses
American television actresses
Actresses in Hindi cinema
American expatriate actresses in India
Clark University alumni
Indian emigrants to the United States
Living people
The New Yorker people
Participants in American reality television series
Top Chef
Women cookbook writers
Women food writers
Writers from Chennai
Writers from New York City
Multilingual writers
Food writers
Cookbook writers
People with Endometriosis